The Best So Far... 2018 Tour Edition is a greatest hits album by Canadian singer Celine Dion, released by Sony Music in Asia-Pacific to coincide with Dion's 2018 tour in this part of the world. The album was issued in Japan on 30 May 2018, in Australia on 6 July 2018 and in New Zealand on 20 July 2018. It includes studio versions of seventeen hits from the years 1993 to 2013. The album artwork consists of a photo taken during Dion's previous 2017 tour. The Best So Far... 2018 Tour Edition peaked at number four in Australia and New Zealand, and number twenty-four in Japan.

Content
The album includes Dion's greatest hits from the years 1993 to 2013, many of which she performed during her Celine Dion Live 2018 tour. It contains Australian number-ones: "The Power of Love", "Because You Loved Me" and "My Heart Will Go On", and also other Australian hits: "Think Twice" (number two), "It's All Coming Back to Me Now" (number eight), "Falling into You" (number 12), "That's the Way It Is" (number 14), "A New Day Has Come" (number 19), "I Drove All Night" (number 22), "Immortality" and "All by Myself" (both peaking at number 38), and "Taking Chances" (number 60). Many of these songs also charted in New Zealand, including top ten hits: "Because You Loved Me", "The Power of Love", "That's the Way It Is" and "It's All Coming Back to Me Now". The Best So Far... 2018 Tour Edition also features Japanese number one, "To Love You More".

Commercial performance
The Best So Far... 2018 Tour Edition debuted at number ten in Australia and became Dion's fourth 'best of' to chart on the ARIA Albums Chart since her first All the Way... A Decade of Song in 1999, while her last was My Love: Essential Collection in 2008. Overall, The Best So Far... 2018 Tour Edition became Dion's ninth top ten album in Australia since her first in 1994, The Colour of My Love. In the fourth week, The Best So Far... 2018 Tour Edition moved up to a new peak position at number four. It also topped the ARIA Physical Albums Chart in August 2018. In other countries, The Best So Far... 2018 Tour Edition peaked at number four in New Zealand and number twenty-four in Japan. In the latter, it also reached number four on the Oricon International Albums Chart.

Track listing

Notes
  signifies a co-producer
  signifies an additional producer
  signifies a vocal producer

Charts

Weekly charts

Year-end charts

Release history

See also
Celine Dion Live 2018

References

External links

2018 greatest hits albums
Celine Dion compilation albums